Nemesia karasbergensis is a species of plant in the family Scrophulariaceae. It is endemic to Namibia.  Its natural habitat is rocky areas.

References

Flora of Namibia
karasbergensis
Least concern plants
Taxonomy articles created by Polbot
Taxa named by Louisa Bolus